New York's 93rd State Assembly district is one of the 150 districts in the New York State Assembly. It has been represented by Chris Burdick since 2021.

Geography
District 93 is in Westchester County. It includes the towns of Bedford, Harrison, Lewisboro, Mount Kisco, New Castle, North Castle, North Salem, Pound Ridge and half of White Plains.

Recent election results

2022

2020

2018

2016

2014

2012

References 

93
Westchester County, New York